Michigan's 16th congressional district is an obsolete United States congressional district in Michigan. It covered the communities of Dearborn, Downriver and Monroe County.

The first Representative to Congress elected from the 16th district, John Lesinski, Sr., took office in 1933, after reapportionment due to the 1930 census. The district was dissolved following the 2000 census. The last Representative elected from the district, John Dingell, was subsequently elected from the 15th district. The only other Representative elected from the 16th district in its 70 years of existence was John Lesinski, Jr. It could be called a Polish district, because all three district's representatives were Polish-Americans.

Voting

List of members representing the district

Elections

Notes

References
 The Political graveyard: U.S. Representatives from Michigan, 1807–2003
 U.S. Representatives 1837–2003, Michigan Manual 2003–2004

 Congressional Biographical Directory of the United States 1774–present

16
Former congressional districts of the United States
Constituencies established in 1933
1933 establishments in Michigan
Constituencies disestablished in 2003
2003 disestablishments in Michigan